The Eye of the World is a high fantasy novel by American writer Robert Jordan, the first book of The Wheel of Time series. It was published by Tor Books and released on 15 January 1990. The unabridged audiobook is read by Michael Kramer and Kate Reading. Upon first publication, The Eye of the World consisted of one prologue and 53 chapters, with an additional prologue authored upon re-release.
The book was a critical, and commercial success. Critics praised the tone, the themes, and the similarity to Lord of the Rings (although some criticized it for that). 

On 2 January 2002, The Eye of the World was re-released as two separate books aimed at a young adult market, with larger text and a handful of illustrations. These were From the Two Rivers and To the Blight. The former included an additional prologue entitled "Ravens", focusing on Egwene al'Vere. The American Library Association put The Eye of the World on its 2003 list of Popular Paperbacks for Young Adults.

After the release of The Wheel of Time television series, The Eye of the World made the January 2022 The New York Times Best Seller list in the mass market category and was number one on the audio fiction list.

Plot
The Eye of the World revolves around protagonists Rand al'Thor, Matrim (Mat) Cauthon, Perrin Aybara, Egwene al'Vere, and Nynaeve al'Meara, after their home town of Emond's Field is unexpectedly attacked by Trollocs (the antagonist's soldiers) and a Myrddraal/Fade (the undead-like officer commanding the Trollocs) intent on capturing Rand, Mat, and Perrin. To save their village from further attacks, Rand, Mat, Perrin, and Egwene flee it, accompanied by the Aes Sedai Moiraine Damodred, her Warder Al'Lan Mandragoran, and gleeman Thom Merrilin, and later joined by Wisdom Nynaeve al'Meara. Pursued by increasing numbers of Trollocs and Myrddraal, the travellers take refuge in the abandoned city of Shadar Logoth, where Mat steals a cursed dagger, thus becoming infected by the malevolent Mashadar. While escaping the city the travelers are separated; Rand, Mat, and Thom travel by boat to Whitebridge, where Thom is lost allowing Rand and Mat to escape a Myrddraal. In Caemlyn, Rand befriends an Ogier named Loial. Trying to catch a glimpse of the recently captured False Dragon, Rand befriends Elayne Trakand, heir apparent to the throne of Andor, and her brothers Gawyn Trakand and Galad Damodred.  Rand is then taken before Queen Morgase, her Aes Sedai advisor, Elaida; and Captain-General of the Queen's Guard Gareth Bryne, and released without charge, in spite of Elaida's grave pronouncements regarding Rand.

Egwene and Perrin are guided separately to Caemlyn by Elyas Machera, a man who can communicate telepathically with wolves and who claims that Perrin can do the same. The three run afoul of the Children of the Light, where Perrin kills two for the death of a wolf at their hands and is sentenced to death. Moiraine, Lan, and Nynaeve rescue Egwene and Perrin, and all are reunited with Rand and Mat. Thereafter Moiraine determines that Mat must travel to Tar Valon, the Aes Sedai's center of power, to overcome the influence of Shadar Logoth.

Loial warns Moiraine of a threat to the Eye of the World, a pool of Saidin untouched by the Dark One's influence, which is confirmed by vivid and disturbing dreams Mat, Rand, and Perrin have had. The Eye of the World is protected by Someshta (the Green Man) and contains one of the seven seals on the Dark One's prison, the Dragon banner of Lews Therin Telamon, and the Horn of Valere. At the civilized world's border, the group enters the Blight (the polluted region under the Dark One's control) to protect the Eye. After a pursuit, they meet the Green Man and he reveals the Eye. The group is then confronted by the Forsaken Aginor and Balthamel. As the battle ensues, Balthamel and the Green Man slay each other. Soon after, Rand defeats Aginor and uses the Eye to decimate the Trolloc army and defeat Ba'alzamon. As a result, Moiraine concludes that Rand is the Dragon Reborn, but her opinion and all other details of the final battle are kept from all the male members of the group except Lan.

Main characters

Rand al'Thor: A shepherd from the Two Rivers, and, unbeknownst to him, the Dragon Reborn. He was one of the three boys Moiraine deduced might be the Dragon Reborn. He, Mat, and Perrin are considered ta'veren. He can channel saidin, and demonstrated that by unconsciously healing Bela (his horse) when they were fleeing from Myrddraal and Trollocs. He also saved the forces of Fal Dara through his dreams. He is the (adopted) son of Tam and Kari al'Thor. He and Mat were separated from the rest of the group during the novel. He is described as having grey eyes and "reddish" hair and being extremely stubborn. 
Matrim Cauthon: A shepherd from Two Rivers, a prankster, considered by most to be untrustworthy, except for his friends. He was one of the three boys Moiriaine deduced might be the Dragon Reborn. He, Rand, and Perrin are considered ta'veren. His ta'veren functions in a way as to provide him luck. 
Perrin Aybara: A blacksmith from the Two Rivers. He was one of the three boys Moiraine deduced might be the Dragon Reborn. He is a "Wolfbrother", someone who can communicate with Wolves, as well gain some of their abilities. He, Rand, and Mat are considered ta'veren. He and Egwene were separated from the rest of the group during the novel, but later meet up with them again. Due to him being a Wolfbrother, he has "burnished golden" eyes that are luminous in the dark, as well as being "slow", so as not to hurt others.
Egwene al'Vere: A woman from the Two Rivers, the apprentice to Nynaeve al'Meara, the Wisdom, and having a close relationship with Rand al'Thor, Matrim Cauthon, and Perrin Aybara. She is chosen by Moiraine to train in Tar Valon because she has the "spark" that allows her to channel. She and Perrin were separated from the rest of the group during the novel, but later meet up with them again. She is described as having "huge brown eyes", and dark hair.
Nynaeve al'Meara: A woman from the Two Rivers, the "Wisdom" of Emond's Field, the youngest ever chosen. She leaves to return Rand, Perrin, Mat, and Egwene to the village, but journeys with them once she realizes she cannot convince them, and that she can channel. She, Moiraine, and Lan are separated from the rest of the group. During this time, she begins developing feelings for Lan. She is described as having a temper and being especially headstrong.

Themes and allusions
Robert Jordan has stated that he consciously intended the early chapters of The Eye of the World to evoke the Shire of Middle-earth in J. R. R. Tolkien's The Lord of the Rings. Despite their similarities, these two works also differ in themes. For instance, both Jordan and Tolkien created narratives that explored power. However, The Eye of the World discussed how it can be deployed whereas The Lord of the Rings was more focused on its renunciation. Rand needed to wield his power so he could successfully fight an emerging war with the Dark One. This theme is antithetical to Frodo's quest to destroy the ring of Sauron, a source of immense power that also corrupted its wearer.

Reception
PBS's The Great American Read named The Eye of the World "one of America's best-loved novels," coming in at #62 on their top 100 list.

Release details

First printing
1990 (February), paperback. Tor Books, United States. 
1990 (15 January), hardcover. Saint Martin's Press, United States. 
1990 (12 July), hardcover. Little, Brown, United Kingdom.  
1990 (12 July), hardcover. Orbit, United Kingdom. 
1992 (15 July), paperback. Orbit, United Kingdom.

Reprinting

1993 (October), paperback. Tom Doherty Associates, United States. 
1995 (December), audio book. Gallant / Publishing Mills, United States. 
1999 (October), hardcover with library binding. Sagebrush, United States. 
2000 (September), paperback. Tor Books, United States.

Divided printing
In January 2002, Starscape Books released The Eye of the World in two separate volumes. The first was titled From the Two Rivers, the second To the Blight. ATOM, a British publishing house, printed both volumes ( and ) the following March.

References

External links

 Detailed summaries of each chapter

1990 American novels
1990 fantasy novels
American fantasy novels
The Wheel of Time books
Novels by Robert Jordan
Tor Books books